Jeff Shield (1953–2009) was an Australian professional rugby league footballer who played in the 1970s. He played for the Balmain Tigers and North Sydney Bears in the New South Wales Rugby League competition.

Shield started playing football with the Waratah-Mayfield club, in the Newcastle area, at the age of 6. He excelled early, and was chosen for New South Wales Primary Schools when they toured Queensland in 1965. Later, he was selected for NSW Combined High Schools in 1969, 1970 and 1971. He was made captain in 1971.

In 1972, Shield signed with the Balmain Tigers at only eighteen years of age.

Shield played for New South Wales in a match against the touring Great Britain side in 1974, scoring a try. At the end of that season, he played the 1974-75 off-season with the Leigh RLFC (Heritage No. 841) in England.

Shield played two more years with the Tigers before joining the Bears for the 1977 season. He then returned to the Newcastle area to play with Macquarie United.

Jeff Shield died on 2 November 2009.

References

 The Encyclopedia of Rugby League Players (with Glen Hudson), Gary Allen, 2007 

1953 births
2009 deaths
Australian rugby league players
Balmain Tigers players
Leigh Leopards players
North Sydney Bears players
Rugby league five-eighths
Rugby league players from Newcastle, New South Wales